Sir William Courtenay ( – 29 September 1557) was a landowner in Devon and de jure 2nd Earl of Devon. He was the son of George Courtenay (d. 1533) and Catherine, daughter of Sir George St Ledger of Annery. He succeeded his grandfather Sir William Courtenay, of Powderham in 1535. He was knighted in 1553 and MP for Plympton in 1555.

Marriage and issue
Around 28 November 1545, he married Lady Elizabeth ( – 4 Nov. 1576), daughter to John Paulet, 2nd Marquess of Winchester and his first wife, Elizabeth Willoughby, by whom he had a son and a daughter: 
 Sir William Courtenay (1553 – 24 June 1630), married firstly, around 18 January 1573, Lady Elizabeth, daughter of Henry Manners, 2nd Earl of Rutland; secondly, Elizabeth, daughter of Sir George Sydenham of Combe Sydenham in Somerset and widow of Sir Francis Drake; thirdly, Jane, daughter of Robert Hill of Yarde, Somerset.
 Jane Courtenay, married, around 20 January 1573, as his first wife, Sir Nicholas Parker of Willingdon.

Death
He took part in the battle of St. Quentin in August 1557 in Picardy, France, and died on 29 September 1557. His widow later married Sir Henry Ughtred, son of Sir Anthony Ughtred and his second wife, Elizabeth Seymour, sister of Jane, third consort of Henry VIII.

In 1831, a decision of the House of Lords determined that he had succeeded his sixth cousin once removed (Edward Courtenay, 1st Earl of Devon) as de jure 2nd Earl of Devon in 1556.

Notes

References

External links
 Hawkyard, A.D.K. (1982). "Courtenay, Sir William II (1529/30-57), of Powderham, Devon and London". In Bindoff, S.T. (ed.). The History of Parliament: the House of Commons 1509-1558. at historyofparliamentonline.org

1529 births

1557 deaths

Year of birth uncertain
Members of the Parliament of England for Plympton Erle
English MPs 1555
16th-century English landowners
Earls of Devon (1553 creation)